Beatrice of England (25 June 1242 – 24 March 1275) was a member of the House of Plantagenet, the daughter of Henry III of England and Eleanor of Provence.

Childhood
Born 25 June 1242, Beatrice was the second-eldest daughter of King Henry III of England and Eleanor of Provence. Beatrice's childhood was plagued by tragedy, and by the stresses of her father's reign coupled with her mother's unpopularity with the English people.

Her oldest brother Edward became dangerously ill when she was very young, though he recovered. However, their youngest sister Katherine, who possibly had a degenerative disease which caused her to become deaf, died at the age of three, leaving Beatrice's parents grief-stricken.

The English were unhappy with King Henry III owing to the influence that Eleanor and her Savoyard kinsmen exercised on the monarchy, and the barons demanded more power. In 1263, Eleanor was sailing on a barge that was attacked by London citizens. This harsh, bitter dislike created several problems for Henry III and his family. On the other hand, Eleanor and Henry enjoyed a happy marriage, and Beatrice grew up in a loving environment, close to her siblings.

Marriage and issue
At one point, Henry conducted negotiations for Beatrice to marry the king of France and also rejected a proposal that she should wed the son of the king of Norway. On 22 January 1260, when she was seventeen, she married John de Dreux, heir to the duchy of Brittany, at Saint-Denis. She and John II had six children:

 Arthur II, Duke of Brittany (1261–1312)
 John of Brittany, Earl of Richmond (1266–1334)
 Marie of Brittany, Countess of Saint-Pol, wife of Guy III of Châtillon (1268–1339)
 Pierre, Viscount de Leon (1269–1312)
 Blanche of Brittany, wife of Philip of Artois (1271–1327)
 Eleanor of Brittany, Abbess of Fontevrault (1275–1342)

Death
Beatrice died on 24 March 1275 in London, England. John II honoured his wife with a chantry, an institutional chapel on private land or within a greater church, which was to be finished when he died, so that he and Beatrice would be together again. Beatrice was buried at Grey Friars Church in Greenwich, London.
Beatrice died before her husband succeeded to the duchy, therefore she was never styled Duchess of Brittany.

Historical overview
Though little information is available concerning Beatrice's activities, she was an important part of English history. Her marriage to John II helped forge an alliance with France, thus placing the Earldom of Richmond under the so-called shield of England.

During Henry's reign, there was much opposition to him in England. At a time when Simon de Montfort wanted to strip the king of some of his power to give more say to the barons, it was necessary for Henry to strengthen his rule via family marriages to useful people. His first daughter had married the king of Scotland, and Beatrice's marriage to John II, who controlled the Earldom of Richmond, gave Henry an additional source of power. Moreover, a substantial number of French nobles came to England and could be appointed to political positions.

When Henry was crowned, very few areas within the Angevin Empire (comprising Gascony, Béarn, Angoulême, Saintonge and Agenais), remained loyal to Henry.

The marriage of Beatrice and John II would prove to be useful for Henry III, if only to help Henry recover Poitou. Now Henry had English security and influence on the northern border, and the instance on English overlordship. Though Henry was planning on regaining Poitou, he was defeated after his campaign. Because he could not regain Poitou, his domains were small compared to the Angevin Empire. With his various strategies, Henry III reigned over England for 56 years until his death in 1272.

Ancestry

Notes

References

Bibliography

1242 births
1275 deaths
13th-century English people
13th-century English women
People from Bordeaux
English princesses
House of Plantagenet
Children of Henry III of England
13th-century French women
13th-century French people
Deaths in childbirth
Daughters of kings